"The Wall" is a song written by country music singer Willie Nelson and producer Buddy Cannon. The track became the first single of Nelson's Band of Brothers.

Overview
In 2014, Nelson released the album Band of Brothers, his first release composed of all songs written by him since the 1996 release of Spirit.

Nelson co-wrote the song with Buddy Cannon based on his life and experiences on the road. "The Wall" became the first single of the album. The official video was released through Rolling Stone on May 6, 2014. It was made available for download on digital stores on the same day, while it was given for free to those who preordered the album. In June 2014, Nelson released through his website an acoustic version of the song.

References

2013 songs
Willie Nelson songs
Songs written by Willie Nelson
Songs written by Buddy Cannon
Song recordings produced by Buddy Cannon
2014 singles